Confúcio Aires Moura (born May 16, 1948 Dianópolis, Tocantins) is a Brazilian politician and member of the Brazilian Democratic Movement Party (PMBD). He served as the Governor of Rondônia between January 1, 2011 and April 6, 2018. In 2018, he has elected to Federal Senate.

References

Living people
1948 births
Governors of Rondônia
Brazilian Democratic Movement politicians
Rondônia politicians